The 22nd Marching Regiment of Foreign Volunteers was a regiment of the French Foreign Legion formed from expatriates living in France at the outbreak of World War II. While established as a different unit, its veterans are recognized as part of the Foreign Legion.

Overview 
On September 16, 1939, the government of Édouard Daladier established Foreign Workers Companies which were not part of the French Foreign Legion. These formations were called Régiments de marche de volontaires étrangers. When it was deployed throughout Alsace on May 6, the 22nd Marching Regiment of the Foreign Volunteers left its training facility at Bacarès.

Organization

See also 

2nd Foreign Infantry Regiment
Marching Regiments of Foreign Volunteers

References 

Marching Regiment of Foreign Volunteers, 22nd
Military units and formations established in 1939
Military units and formations disestablished in 1940